The 1890 Purdue football team was an American football team that represented Purdue University during the 1890 college football season. The team compiled a 3–3 record in the university's third season fielding an intercollegiate football team. Clinton L. Hare, a Yale alumnus who had been the coach of the Butler football teams that handed Purdue its sole losses in 1887 and 1889, was hired as Purdue's football coach in 1890. On November 1, 1890, Purdue lost to Michigan, 34–6, in the first football game between two teams that would later become members of the Big Ten Conference. Three weeks after losing to Michigan, Purdue defeated Illinois, 62–0. The team concluded its 1890 season with a loss to Butler, leaving Purdue 0–3 in three games against Butler football teams since 1887.

Robert A. Lackey was the team captain.

Schedule

References

Purdue
Purdue Boilermakers football seasons
Purdue football